Jim Horne (born January 20, 1959) is a former Florida State Senator and Florida Commissioner of Education. He is an accountant and has worked in the real estate and consulting businesses. He resigned as Commissioner of Education in 2004.

Horne served in the Florida Legislature from 1995 to 2001 and was chairman of the Senate committee that handles the state budget. He represented Orange Park, Florida. The Florida Crossroads public television program spent a day with him while he served as Florida's education commissioner. He founded the Horne Group, a government consulting and business development company.

References

External links

|-

Florida state senators
People from Orange Park, Florida
Living people
1959 births